India competed at the 1992 Summer Paralympics in Barcelona, Spain. 9 competitors from India won no medals and so did not place in the medal table.

See also 
 India at the Paralympics
 India at the 1992 Summer Olympics

References 

India at the Paralympics
1992 in Indian sport
Nations at the 1992 Summer Paralympics